Joseph Winston Scott (born July 28, 1965) is an American college basketball coach who is currently in his second stint as the head coach at Air Force. Scott previously was head coach at Air Force once before, as well as at Princeton and Denver.

Early life and education
Growing up on Pelican Island near Toms River, New Jersey, Scott played baseball, basketball and football at Toms River High School East, where he set the school's basketball career scoring record. Scott played at point guard in high school and set a school record for career basketball points with 1,550.

As a player in the mid-1980s, Scott learned the "Princeton offense," a methodical system that seeks high-percentage shots by passing until the right opportunity rather than a fast-pace offense with more shots.  As a result, Scott has frequently instituted a deliberate pace as a coach, often coaching the slowest-paced team in the country.

In 1990, Scott earned his J.D. degree at Notre Dame Law School and became a personal injury lawyer at New Jersey law firm Ribis, Graham, & Carter. In 2004, Scott reflected on his legal career: "If you are not a public defender or a prosecutor, most of the time what you are trying to do is help yourself, and when I was doing what I was doing every day, I sat there and said, ‘Who am I helping?’ It's all about billing hours."

Coaching career

Early coaching career (1991–2000)
After being an assistant coach at Monmouth University for the 1991–92 season, Scott returned to Princeton as an assistant coach, first under Pete Carril from 1992 to 1996 and Bill Carmody from 1996 to 2000. Scott's time as assistant coach included a 1996 win over defending champion UCLA in the NCAA Tournament and a no. 7 ranking and another second-round NCAA appearance in 1998. The 1998 team earned a No. 5 seed in the NCAA Tournament, the highest ranking ever for an Ivy League school.

First stint at Air Force (2000–2004)
From 2000 to 2004, Scott was head coach at Air Force. Scott accrued a 51–63 record, starting with an 8–21 record but improving each season. In 2003–04, Scott led Air Force to a 22–7 record, Mountain West Conference regular season title, and an at-large NCAA tournament appearance. Scott earned Mountain West Coach of the Year honors and finished fourth in polling for AP Coach of the Year.

Princeton (2004–2007)
Scott succeeded John Thompson III  as the head coach at Princeton in 2004 and had a 38–45 record through three seasons. The team finished sixth in the Ivy League in 2004–05, his first season, with a 6–8 record, before rebounding to a 10–4 mark good for second place in the conference in 2005–06. Scott Greenman, a senior point guard, became Scott's first and only First-Team All-Ivy player in 2006.

Denver (2007–2016)
Scott then served as head coach at the University of Denver from 2007 to 2016. During these nine seasons, Denver went 146–132 and had one postseason appearance, in the NIT, in the same year Denver shared the regular season WAC title in its lone season in the conference. On March 11, 2016, Denver fired Scott with two years remaining on his contract. An associate vice chancellor at Denver commented: "We want to get to the NCAA Tournament in men’s basketball. We looked at what Joe’s team had done over the nine years and decided it was time to make a transition. Postseason success had not occurred."

Holy Cross and Georgia assistant (2016–2020)
On May 23, 2016, Scott became an assistant coach at Holy Cross for his second stint working under Bill Carmody, having previously been an assistant under Carmody at Princeton from 1996 to 2000. After two seasons with Holy Cross, Scott was hired by Tom Crean to be an assistant at the University of Georgia.

Second stint at Air Force (2020–present)
On March 31, 2020, Scott returned to Air Force for his second stint as head coach.

Head coaching record

Personal life
Scott's wife, Leah Spraragen, is a 1992 Princeton graduate who played at point guard for Princeton Tigers women's basketball. They have two children.

References

External links
 Air Force bio
 Georgia Bulldogs bio
 Holy Cross Crusaders bio

1965 births
Living people
Air Force Falcons men's basketball coaches
American men's basketball coaches
American men's basketball players
Basketball coaches from New Jersey
Basketball players from New Jersey
College men's basketball head coaches in the United States
Denver Pioneers men's basketball coaches
Georgia Bulldogs basketball coaches
Holy Cross Crusaders men's basketball coaches
Monmouth Hawks men's basketball coaches
Point guards
Princeton Tigers men's basketball coaches
Princeton Tigers men's basketball players
Sportspeople from Toms River, New Jersey
Toms River High School East alumni
New Jersey lawyers
Notre Dame Law School alumni